Dragan Vaščanin (born 22 December 1971) is a Serbian professional basketball coach.

Coaching career 
In the early 2000s, Vaščanin was an assistant for FMP Železnik and Budućnost.

In summer 2004, Vaščanin became a head coach for the Bosnian club Hercegovac Bileća. In August 2005, Vaščanin became a head coach for Napredak Kruševac. He got fired in December 2005. Two weeks later, he was named a head coach for Atlas. 

Vaščanin was a head coach of the Serbia men's under-16 team at the 2007 FIBA Europe Under-16 Championship in Greece and the 2008 FIBA Europe Under-16 Championship in Italy. Hw won the gold medal at the 2007 Championship.

In the late 2000s, Vaščanin coached Nova Gorica (Slovenia), Radnički Basket, and Crnokosa.

Middle East 
In summer 2011, Vaščanin was named a youth coach of Bahraini club Manama Club. In summer 2012, Vaščanin became a head coach, as well as a youth coach, for Al Kuwait of the Kuwaiti Division I League. On 31 July 2016, he became a head coach for Al-Nweidrat of the Bahraini Premier League.

In August 2018, Vaščanin signed for Al-Sharjah of the UAE League as an assistant coach and a youth teams coordinator.

Career achievements 
 Cup of Serbia winner: 1 (with Atlas Belgrade: 2005–06)
 Yugoslavian Junior League champion: 1 (with Beovuk Juniors: 1995–96)
 Kuwait U18 League champion: 2 (with BC Kuwait U18 team: 2013, 2014)
 Kuwait U20 League champion: 1 (with BC Kuwait U20 team: 2015)

References

External links
Profile at mybasketballagent.com
Profile at eurobasket.com

1971 births
Living people
KK Beopetrol/Atlas Beograd coaches
KK Crvena zvezda youth coaches
KK Napredak Kruševac coaches
KK Srem coaches
KK Crnokosa coaches
KK FMP coaches
Serbian expatriate basketball people in Bahrain
Serbian expatriate basketball people in Bosnia and Herzegovina
Serbian expatriate basketball people in Kuwait
Serbian expatriate basketball people in Montenegro
Serbian expatriate basketball people in Slovenia
Serbian expatriate basketball people in the United Arab Emirates
Serbian men's basketball coaches